Fibicius (otherwise Fibitius or Felicius) was Bishop of Trier from around 502 to 525 or so.

Life
Fibicius' tenure as bishop in the first quarter of the 6th century fell in the politically troubled times during the expansion of Frankish power into the region around Trier.
 
His name is given in the Trier bishops' lists and in the Vita Goaris, a hagiography of Saint Goar. While he was bishop, the revival of the power of the church in Trier was gradually beginning after a period of obscurity and weakness due to the political situation. This is evidenced by the resumption of earlier attempts at evangelization in areas on the Middle Rhine. In this context, Fibicius probably gave permission in about 511 to Saint Goar to build a church in Oberwesel. He may have also requested King Theuderic I to send priests from the Auvergne to Trier.
 
Fibicius is sometimes held to be the founder and first abbot of St. Maximin's Abbey, but the authorities disagree about this.

After his death he was probably buried in the church of St. Nicholas in Trier. His successor was probably Aprunculus; the bishop called Rusticus whose name is sometimes inserted into the bishops' lists between the two seems to have no existence outside the Vita Goaris.

Fibicius is venerated as either a saint or a blessed; his feast day is 5 November. No further information is available about the circumstances of his death.

References

Sources
 Hans Hubert Anton: Trier im frühen Mittelalter (= Quellen und Forschungen aus dem Gebiete der Geschichte. N.F., 9). Paderborn u. a. 1987, pp. 87f.
 Vollständiges Heiligen-Lexikon, Band 2. Augsburg 1861, p. 202. Online version

External links
 Saarland-biografien.de 

Gallo-Roman saints
Saints of Germania
Year of birth unknown
510s deaths
6th-century Frankish bishops
6th-century Christian saints
Roman Catholic bishops of Trier